Rosemarie Schubert (born 7 November 1943) is a German athlete. She competed in the women's javelin throw at the 1964 Summer Olympics.

References

1943 births
Living people
Athletes (track and field) at the 1964 Summer Olympics
German male javelin throwers
Olympic athletes of the United Team of Germany
Sportspeople from Wrocław